Beyneu is a village and the administrative center of Beyneu District in Mangystau Region in western Kazakhstan.

Beyneu first began to expand in the 1970s from a village to a city with the discovery of oil in the area. There is a railway station, and further up north in Kasura, there is a Chevron oil plant. The gas pipeline of the Central Asia–Center gas pipeline system metering station at Beyneu on the border with Uzbekistan. Trains from Russia to Uzbekistan and Tajikistan also pass through it.

References

Populated places in Mangystau Region